Como Te Llama (Spanish for "What Do They Call You") may refer to:

¿Cómo Te Llama?, a 2008 album by Albert Hammond Jr.
"Como Te Llama", a song from the 2021 compilation Slime Language 2